Madrid is the primary hamlet and a census-designated place (CDP) in the town of Madrid in St. Lawrence County, New York, United States. At the 2020 census, it had a population of 736, out of 1,735 in the entire town of Madrid.

The community is in northern St. Lawrence County, south of the center of the town of Madrid. New York State Route 310 runs through Madrid, leading northeast  to Massena and southwest  to Canton. State Route 345 crosses NY 310 south of the center of the hamlet. It leads north-northwest  to Waddington on the St. Lawrence River and southeast  to Potsdam.

The Grass River, a tributary of the St. Lawrence River, flows northeastward through the center of Madrid.

Demographics

References 

Census-designated places in St. Lawrence County, New York
Census-designated places in New York (state)